Toronto—Scarborough was a federal electoral district represented in the House of Commons of Canada from 1925 to 1935. It was located in the east end of the city of Toronto, in the province of Ontario. This riding was created in 1924 from parts of York East riding.

The electoral district was abolished in 1933 when it was redistributed between Broadview, Danforth, Greenwood and York West ridings.

Electoral history

|- 
  
|Conservative
|HARRIS, Joseph Henry
|align="right"|18,481
  
|Liberal
|BEER, Edwin Charles 
|align="right"|4,281
|}

|- 
  
|Conservative
|HARRIS, Joseph Henry 
|align="right"| 14,938
  
|Liberal
|WALKER, Frank Norman  
|align="right"|3,556    
|}

|-
  
|Conservative
|HARRIS, Joseph Henry  
|align="right"| 17,122 
  
|Liberal
| FORD, William Henry 
|align="right"| 6,156
|}

See also 

 List of Canadian federal electoral districts
 Past Canadian electoral districts

External links 

 Website of the Parliament of Canada

Former federal electoral districts of Ontario
Federal electoral districts of Toronto